George Enescu International Airport  is an airport located in Bacău, Romania. Named after the Romanian composer George Enescu. Bacău Airport shares its runway with RoAF 95th Air Base, and Aerostar, a major Romanian aerospace and defence company.

History
Bacău Airport opened for passenger service in 1946. A modern terminal building with a control tower began construction in 1970, and was completed in 1971. In 1975, it received international status. A 2005 renovation/expansion remodeled the terminal building. In 2018, a new terminal was opened and the old one demolished.

In 2009, Bacău Airport became the first Romanian airport to be privately administered by a nongovernmental company. BlueAero, its administrator, was 100% owned by the fully private airline Blue Air. The new company that took over the airport is nowadays the main operator. Other airlines that operated here were TAROM, which withdraw its flights, and Carpatair, which canceled all its scheduled flights. When Blue Air was sold because its parent company's holding went into bankruptcy, the airport was returned to the local government administration. The modernization promised in the takeover contract was completed to a less than 10% status due to financial problems in the holding. Since June 2021, TAROM had been operating flights from the airport again, starting with the charter flight to Antalya, Turkey, with direct flights to several major Romanian cities planned to be introduced at a later date.

In February 2014, the new owners, a 50-50 joint venture between the city and county public administrations, started a new modernization program. The project involved the construction of a passenger terminal with a processing capacity of 300 passengers per hour, a control tower, a parking area, and an intermodal bus terminal, as well as the refurbishment of the runway. In November 2017, the new passenger terminal was inaugurated.

Airlines and destinations
The following airlines operate regular scheduled and charter flights at Bacău Airport:

Military usage
The airport is home to the Romanian Air Force 95th Air Base, with one fighter regiment (operating MiG-21 LanceR) and a helicopter regiment (operating IAR-330L). The base is also home to the 250th training regiment.

Statistics

Traffic figures

See also
Aviation in Romania
Transport in Romania

References

External links
 Official website
 Google Map - Aerial View
 

Airports in Romania
Airport
Buildings and structures in Bacău County
Airports established in 1946
1946 establishments in Romania